The Elindus Arena, formerly named the Regenboogstadion, is a stadium in Waregem, Belgium.  It is currently used mostly for football matches and is the home ground of S.V. Zulte-Waregem. Regenboogstadion is Dutch for Rainbow Stadium. The stadium was named after the rainbow jersey worn by the cycling road world champions, since it was inaugurated to host the 1957 UCI Road World Championships. From the 2020-21 season however, the stadium name will change to Elindus Arena, after a local sponsor.

References

Sports venues completed in 1957
Football venues in Flanders
Sports venues in West Flanders